Kadegaon is a village and taluka of Sangli district of Maharashtra in India.

Kadegaon is a Taluka in Sangli District of Maharashtra, India. Kadegaon Taluka's Headquarters is Kadegaon village. It is in the Paschim Maharashtra region, Pune Division. It is located 63 km north of the district headquarters of Sangli and 290 km south of the state capital, Mumbai.

Kadegaon Taluka is bounded by Karad Taluka towards west, Palus Taluka towards South, Khanapur-Vita Taluka towards East, Khatav Taluka towards North.

Demographics
As of the 2011 Census of India, Kadegon village had a population of  spread over  households.

Kadepur 
 Wangi

References

Cities and towns in Sangli district
Talukas in Maharashtra